Peter J. Dale (July 4, 1845 – April 20, 1935) was a Norwegian-American elected official who served as a member of the Wisconsin State Assembly.

Peter Jorgen Dale was born at Lyster in Sogn og Fjordane, Norway. He was one of six children born to Jorgen Pederson Dale and Martha Larsdotter  Dale. In 1860, he emigrated to the United States with his family and settled in Wisconsin. 

He served as Justice of the peace and town clerk of Coon Prairie (now Christiana, Wisconsin).
During the 1877, he was elected to serve as a member of the Wisconsin State Assembly session from Vernon County, Wisconsin. Originally elected to public office as a Republican, he later supported the People's Party. In 1890, he moved to Kandiyohi County, Minnesota where he settled on a farm near Willmar, Minnesota. Peter Dale married Gjertrud Olsdotter and together they had eight children.

References

People from Luster, Norway
Norwegian emigrants to the United States
People from Vernon County, Wisconsin
Republican Party members of the Wisconsin State Assembly
1845 births
1935 deaths